Ammonicera is a genus of minute sea snails, marine gastropod molluscs or micromollusks in the family Omalogyridae.

Species
Species within the genus Ammonicera include:
 Ammonicera albanyensis Rubio & Rolán, 2020
 Ammonicera albospeciosa  Rolán, 1992
 Ammonicera andresi  J. D. Oliver & Rolán, 2015
 Ammonicera angulata Sleurs, 1985
 Ammonicera arrondoi  J. D. Oliver & Rolán, 2015
 Ammonicera aurea Waki, Rolán, Noseworthy, H.-S. Kang & K.-S. Choi, 2017
 Ammonicera binodosa Sleurs, 1985
 Ammonicera burnayi  Rolán, 1991
 Ammonicera caledonica Rubio & Rolán, 2020
 Ammonicera chosenica Chernyshev, 2003
 Ammonicera circumcirra  Rolán, 1992
 Ammonicera columbretensis  J. D. Oliver & Rolán, 2015
 Ammonicera croata Rubio & Rolán, 2020
 Ammonicera extracarinacostata Sleurs, 1985
 Ammonicera familiaris  Rolán, 1992
 Ammonicera fischeriana (Monterosato, 1869)
 Ammonicera galaica  J. D. Oliver & Rolán, 2015
 Ammonicera gonzalezi Rolán & Rubio, 2017
 Ammonicera japonica Habe, 1972
 Ammonicera lignea (Palazzi, 1988)
 Ammonicera lineofuscata  Rolán, 1992
 Ammonicera mcleani  Sartori & Bieler, 2014 
 Ammonicera mexicana  Sartori & Bieler, 2014 
 Ammonicera minortalis  Rolán, 1992
 Ammonicera multistriata  Rolán, 1991
 Ammonicera nodicarinata (Sleurs, 1985)
 Ammonicera nodulosa  J. D. Oliver & Rolán, 2015
 Ammonicera nolai  Rolán, 1991
 Ammonicera oteroi  Rolán, 1991
 Ammonicera pascuensis Rubio & Rolán, 2020
 Ammonicera plana Simone, 1997
 Ammonicera plicata Sleurs, 1985
 Ammonicera robusta  Rolán, 1991
 Ammonicera rota (Forbes & Hanley, 1850)
 Ammonicera rotundata (Palazzi, 1988)
 Ammonicera san Rolán & Peñas, 2009
 Ammonicera sculpturata  Rolán, 1992
 Ammonicera shornikovi Chernyshev, 2003
 Ammonicera sleursi  Sartori & Bieler, 2014
 Ammonicera sucina (Laseron, 1954)  
 Ammonicera superstriata  J. D. Oliver & Rolán, 2015
 Ammonicera tahitiensis Rubio, Rolán & Letourneux, 2020
 Ammonicera tenuicostata Sleurs, 1985
 Ammonicera tomalba Rubio & Rolán, 2020
 Ammonicera tomensis Rubio & Rolán, 2020
 Ammonicera vangoethemi (Sleurs, 1985) 
 Ammonicera verdensis  Rolán, 1991
 Ammonicera vladivostokensis Chernyshev, 2003

References

 Vaught, K.C. (1989). A classification of the living Mollusca. American Malacologists: Melbourne, FL (USA). . XII, 195 pp. 
 Bieler R & Mikkelsen P. (1998), Ammonicera in Florida - Notes on the smallest living gastropod in the United States and comments on other species of Omalogyridae (Heterobranchia); The Nautilus, 111(1):1-12, 1998
 Gofas, S.; Le Renard, J.; Bouchet, P. (2001). Mollusca, in: Costello, M.J. et al. (Ed.) (2001). European register of marine species: a check-list of the marine species in Europe and a bibliography of guides to their identification. Collection Patrimoines Naturels, 50: pp. 180–213
 Rolán E., 2005. Malacological Fauna From The Cape Verde Archipelago. Part 1, Polyplacophora and Gastropoda
 Spencer, H.; Marshall. B. (2009). All Mollusca except Opisthobranchia. In: Gordon, D. (Ed.) (2009). New Zealand Inventory of Biodiversity. Volume One: Kingdom Animalia. 584 pp

External links

 Vayssiere, A. 1893. Observations zoologiques anatomiques sur l'Ammonicera, nouveau genre de gasteropode prosobranche. Annales de la Faculte des Sciences de Marseille, 3 15-28 1 pl.

Omalogyridae
Gastropod genera